Mexico–Palestine relations are the diplomatic relations between the United Mexican States and the State of Palestine. Both nations are members of UNESCO. Mexico does not recognise Palestine as a state.

History 

During the United Nations Partition Plan for Palestine vote on 29 November 1947; Mexico was one of ten countries that abstained from voting. In August 1975, Mexican President Luis Echeverría met with then head of the Palestine Liberation Organization (PLO), Yasser Arafat, in Cairo, Egypt and the Mexican government soon established diplomatic relations with the PLO. That same year, the PLO opened an 'Information office' in Mexico City which was elevated to a 'Special Delegation office' in 1995 after the Second Oslo Accord where an agreement was made between Israel and the PLO for the West Bank and the Gaza Strip to have an interim self-government in the Palestinian territories.

In June 2000, Mexican Foreign Minister Rosario Green paid an official visit to Gaza City and Ramallah.  During her visit, Foreign Minister Green met with President of the Palestinian National Authority, Yasser Arafat and conveyed to him the message sent by Mexican President Ernesto Zedillo formally inviting Arafat to Mexico. Foreign Minister Green also met with the Minister for Planning and International Cooperation. In 2005, Mexico opened a representative office in Ramallah.

In 2009, Foreign Minister Riyad al-Maliki paid a visit to Mexico, becoming the first Palestinian foreign minister to do so. In 2011, Mexico abstained from voting for allowing Palestine to be a member of UNESCO. In 2012, Mexico voted in favor of Palestine becoming an observer state at the United Nations General Assembly, an upgrade from non-state observer. In June 2011, a statue of former President of the Palestinian National Authority, Yasser Arafat, was unveiled in Mexico City. In 2013, the Mexican Congress installed a section in its building to 'Mexico-Palestine Friendship.' During multiple conflicts between Israel and Palestine; Mexico has remained neutral and has asked that both parties cease fighting and continue with the peace process.

In December 2018, Foreign Minister Riyad al-Maliki paid a visit to Mexico to attend the inauguration for Mexican President Andrés Manuel López Obrador.

High-level visits
High-level visits from Mexico to Palestine
 Foreign Secretary Rosario Green (2000)
 Foreign Undersecretary Lourdes Aranda (2009)
 Undersecretary for Multilateral Affairs and Human Rights Juan Manuel Gómez Robledo (2009)
 Foreign Undersecretary Carlos de Icaza (2013)
 Director General for Africa and the Middle East Jorge Álvarez Fuentes (2017)
 Undersecretary for Multilateral Affairs and Human Rights Miguel Ruiz Cabañas (2018)

High-level visits from Palestine to Mexico
 Foreign Minister Riyad al-Maliki (2009, 2011, 2012)
 Senior Diplomatic Advisor Majdi Khaldi (2009)
 Governor of Ramallah Laila Ghannam (2014)

Bilateral agreements
Both nations have signed a few agreements such as a Twinning Agreement between the cities of Bethlehem and Monterrey (1999); Memorandum of Understanding between the Secretariat of Foreign Relations of Mexico and the Ministry of Foreign Affairs of the Palestinian National Authority (2009), Agreement of Cooperation in the Health Field between the Secretariat of Health of Mexico and the Ministry of Health of the Palestinian National Authority (2011); and a Twinning Agreement between the cities of Ramallah and Toluca (2014).

Financial aid

In December 2008, Mexico made a financial contribution of US$50,000 to the Operation Line of Life in Gaza, of the World Food Programme (WFP), in order to help provide food assistance to 365,000 Palestinians, including 50,000 school-age children from 85 educational centers in the Gaza Strip.

On 12 October, 2014, Mexico was present at the Donors Meeting in Cairo, Egypt for the reconstruction of Gaza, for which the Mexican government made a pledge to donate US$1.1 million to alleviate the humanitarian crisis in Gaza. 

Mexico annually makes a voluntary contribution to the United Nations Relief and Works Agency for Palestine Refugees in the Near East (UNRWA). In 2017, Mexico increased its annual contribution to US$250,000.

Resident diplomatic missions 
 Mexico has a representative office in Ramallah.
 Palestine has a special delegation office in Mexico City.

See also 
 Palestinian Mexicans

References

 
Palestine
Bilateral relations of the State of Palestine